Sir Ellis Kadoorie Secondary School (West Kowloon) (SEKSS(WK)) is a secondary school in Tai Kok Tsui, Yau Tsim Mong District, Kowloon, Hong Kong.

It was established on 16 October 1916 as The Ellis Kadoorie School for Indians by the Governor of Hong Kong. Its purpose was to educate children of South Asian descent. The school states that its heritage originates from the Kadoorie School set up in Sai Ying Poon in the 1890s.

The initial institution was primary only but secondary levels were added in the 1960s. Form 4 came in 1977, and Form 5 came in 1978. In 1980 the Kadoorie School was divided into separate schools for primary and secondary levels.

In 1994 Sir Ellis Kadoorie Secondary was the sole government-operated secondary school with a programme catering to non-ethnic Chinese students.

Admissions
 its catchment is Hong Kong wide and does not have admission preferences based on location.

Curriculum
Its secondary curriculum uses the Hong Kong Certificate of Education Examination format. English is the language of instruction.

Student body
In the 2000-2001 school year, 35% of the students were of Pakistani origin, 26% were of Indian origin, 19% were of Filipino origin, 10% were ethnic Chinese, and 7% were of Nepalese origin. In 1994, over 50% were of Indian origin. At that time the total number of students exceeded 300.

References

Notes

External links

 Sir Ellis Kadoorie Secondary School

Secondary schools in Hong Kong
Tai Kok Tsui
Schools in Kowloon
1916 establishments in Hong Kong
Educational institutions established in 1916